Phalut or Falut  is the second highest peak of West Bengal, India. Part of the Singalila Ridge in the Himalayas, it is located at the border of the Indian states of West Bengal and Sikkim and of Nepal. It is located inside the Singalila National Park. A small bunkhouse is near the top of the peak and is administered by the Indian army. Singalila Pass is 17 km away from Phalut.

The indigenous tribes surrounding the mountain peak are known as Falutians by outsiders. Falutians have a 300-year history of worshipping the mountain peak, and believe that Phalut is an omniscient god. They refer to the mountain peak as "Omna Re Ay".

Mountains of West Bengal
Geography of Darjeeling district
India–Nepal border